In mathematics, the Landweber exact functor theorem, named after Peter Landweber, is a theorem in algebraic topology. It is known that a complex orientation of a homology theory leads to a formal group law. The Landweber exact functor theorem (or LEFT for short) can be seen as a method to reverse this process: it constructs a homology theory out of a formal group law.

Statement
This is isomorphic to the graded Lazard ring . This means that giving a formal group law F (of degree ) over a graded ring  is equivalent to giving a graded ring morphism . Multiplication by an integer  is defined inductively as a power series, by

 and 

Let now F be a formal group law over a ring . Define for a topological space X

Here  gets its -algebra structure via F. The question is: is E a homology theory? It is obviously a homotopy invariant functor, which fulfills excision. The problem is that tensoring in general does not preserve exact sequences. Peter Landweber found another criterion:

Theorem (Landweber exact functor theorem)
Then 

is a homology theory on CW-complexes.

In particular, every formal group law F over a ring  yields a module over  since we get via F a ring morphism .

Remarks
There is also a version for Brown–Peterson cohomology BP. The statement of the LEFT stays true if one fixes a prime p and substitutes BP for MU.
The LEFT can be strengthened as follows: let  be the (homotopy) category of Landweber exact -modules and  the category of MU-module spectra M such that  is Landweber exact. Then the functor  is an equivalence of categories. The inverse functor (given by the LEFT) takes -algebras to (homotopy) MU-algebra spectra (see Hovey, Strickland, 1999, Thm 2.7).

Examples
The archetypical and first known (non-trivial) example is complex K-theory K. Complex K-theory is complex oriented and has as formal group law . The corresponding morphism  is also known as the Todd genus. We have then an isomorphism
 
called the Conner–Floyd isomorphism.

While complex K-theory was constructed before by geometric means, many homology theories were first constructed via the Landweber exact functor theorem. This includes elliptic homology, the Johnson–Wilson theories  and the Lubin–Tate spectra .

While homology with rational coefficients  is Landweber exact, homology with integer coefficients  is not Landweber exact. Furthermore, Morava K-theory K(n) is not Landweber exact.

Modern reformulation
If , then M has the extra datum of a  coaction. A coaction on the ring level corresponds to that  is an equivariant sheaf with respect to an action of an affine group scheme G. It is a theorem of Quillen that  and assigns to every ring R the group of power series 
. 
It acts on the set of formal group laws  via 
.
These are just the coordinate changes of formal group laws. Therefore, one can identify the stack quotient  with the stack of (1-dimensional) formal groups  and  defines a quasi-coherent sheaf over this stack.

Refinements to -ring spectra
As of 2010, the best progress was made by Jacob Lurie. This theorem is important for the construction of topological modular forms.

See also 

 Chromatic homotopy theory

References
 
 
 .
 

Algebraic Topology